In a flowing stream, a riffle-pool sequence (also known as a pool-riffle sequence)  develops as a stream's hydrological flow structure alternates from areas of relatively shallow to deeper water. This sequence is present only in streams carrying gravel or coarser sediments. Riffles are formed in shallow areas by coarser materials, such as gravel deposits, over which water flows. Pools are deeper, calmer areas whose bed load (in general) is made up of finer material such as silt. Streams with only sand or silt laden beds do not develop the feature. The sequence within a stream bed commonly occurs at intervals of from 5 to 7 stream widths. Meandering streams with relatively coarse bed load tend to develop a riffle-pool sequence with pools in the outsides of the bends and riffles in the crossovers between one meander to the next on the opposite margin of the stream. The pools are areas of active erosion and the material eroded tends to be deposited in the riffle areas between them.

References

External links
 Flow in Natural Streams, Federal Highway Administration
 Channel types in Ritter, Michael E. (2006) The Physical Environment: an Introduction to Physical Geography
 A description of the sequence

Limnology
Physical geography
Geomorphology
Rivers
Water streams